Lúcio Oliveira Pires (born 26 November 1992) is a Santomean footballer who plays as a defender for Ferreiras and the São Tomé and Príncipe national team.

International career
Oliveira made his professional debut with the São Tomé and Príncipe national team in a 1–0 2021 Africa Cup of Nations qualification loss to Ghana on 18 November 2019.

References

External links
 
 
 

1992 births
Living people
São Tomé and Príncipe footballers
São Tomé and Príncipe international footballers
Association football defenders
Campeonato de Portugal (league) players
São Tomé and Príncipe expatriate footballers
São Tomé and Príncipe expatriates in Portugal
Expatriate footballers in Portugal